Yvonne Wartiainen (born in 1976) is a Norwegian painter. She was born in Kirkenes but has been living in Oslo since 1997. Wartiainen's paintings often mix figurative shapes with abstract motives, and her art has been purchased by several large organizations in Norway; including Statoil and Amnesty International.

References

External links
 Yvonne Wartiainen's official website

Living people
1976 births
Abstract painters
20th-century Norwegian painters
21st-century Norwegian painters
Norwegian women painters
20th-century Norwegian women artists
21st-century Norwegian women artists
People from Sør-Varanger